Chanbalu Qeshlaq (also Romanized as Chanbalū Qeshlāq; also known as Chebenlū-ye Qeshlāq and Qeshlāq-e Razī) is a village in Arshaq-e Markazi Rural District, Arshaq District, Meshgin Shahr County, Ardabil Province, Iran. At the 2006 census, its population was 27, in 8 families.

References 

Tageo

Towns and villages in Meshgin Shahr County